Kafrud (also Romanized as Kafrūd, Kafarved, and Kafrood) is a village in Rudasht-e Sharqi Rural District, Bon Rud District, Isfahan County, Isfahan Province, Iran. At the 2006 census, its population was 1,546, in 394 families.

References 

Populated places in Isfahan County